The Schooler Creek Group is a stratigraphic unit of Middle to Late Triassic (Ladinian to Norian) age in the Western Canadian Sedimentary Basin. It is present in northeastern British Columbia. It was named for Schooler Creek, a left tributary of Williston Lake, and was first described in two oil wells (Pacific Fort St. John No. 16 and Southern Production No. B-14-1) northwest of Fort St. John, by F.H. McLearn in 1921. Exposures along Williston Lake serve as a type locality in outcrop.

Lithology
The Schooler Creek Group is composed of limestone and dolomite, with subordinate siltstone, shale, sandstone, and evaporite minerals such as gypsum and anhydrite.

Distribution
In the subsurface, it extends throughout the plains of the Peace River Country.

Relationship to other units
The Schooler Creek Group is unconformably overlain by the Fernie shale, or by the Bullhead or Fort St. John Group. It conformably overlies the Toad Formation or the Doig Formation.

Subdivisions

The Schooler Creek Group has the following sub-divisions from top to base:

References

Geologic groups of North America
Geologic formations of Canada
Western Canadian Sedimentary Basin
Stratigraphy of British Columbia
Triassic British Columbia